The M829 is an American armor-piercing fin-stabilized discarding sabot (APFSDS) tank round. Modeling was done at the Ballistic Research Laboratory at Aberdeen Proving Ground, which was incorporated into the Army Research Laboratory in 1992. The round is specifically designed for the 120 mm M256 main gun on the Abrams M1A1 and M1A2 main battle tanks. The penetrator is carried by a sabot during its acceleration in the gun barrel.

Variants

M829 
The M829 has a ballistic nose and five tail fins made of aluminum. It is carried in the gun tube by a three-piece aluminum sabot, which separates into three "petals" soon after the round leaves the gun tube. The propulsion system uses an obturating case base with a semi-combustible cartridge wall. According to Jane's, the M829 is capable of penetrating  of RHA steel armor at up to a  range. The original M829 is no longer in production and has been succeeded by the M829A1, M829A2, and M829A3. The corresponding training round is the M865, costing $1,121.

M829A1 
The M829A1 (nicknamed the "Silver Bullet" by Operation Desert Storm tank crews) proved itself in 1991 against Iraqi T-55 and T-72M tanks during Operation Desert Storm. The  penetrator and its sabot together weigh .

M829A2 

The next generation ammunition, called 120 mm APFSDS-T M829A2, entered service in 1994 and is the armor-piercing ammunition currently being produced by General Dynamics Ordnance and Tactical Systems for the 120 mm M256 gun of M1A1 and M1A2 tanks. It is a technology improvement over the M829A1. The new ammunition's performance gains, while classified, result from several new features. These include a special manufacturing process that improves the structural quality of the depleted uranium penetrator. This, the use of new composites for the sabot, and a new propellant provide superior penetrator performance. Combined, these features increase the muzzle velocity of the M829A2 to approximately 100 m/s greater than the M829A1's (up to approximately 1,675 m/s) while operating at slightly lower pressure. The projectile's length is 780 mm, its mass 9 kg.

On 6 May 2014, the U.S. Army announced that it awarded a US$12 million contract to defense contractor General Dynamics for the demilitarization and disposal of 78,000 aging depleted-uranium (DU) tank rounds as newer rounds are added to the U.S. war reserves. The contract includes M829A1 and M829A2 rounds.

M829A3 
With the Soviet creation of the Kontakt-5 Explosive Reactive Amour (ERA), the M829A2 was the US immediate response, developed in part to take on this new ERA type. The M829A3 is a further improvement, designed to defeat any future armor protection methods, like 'Kaktus' ERA, which was seen on the now canceled prototype tank, the Object 640 "Chiorny Oriol" (Black Eagle) (sometimes falsely named the T-80UM-2). It completed type classification standard in March 2003. Very little is publicly known about the round, perhaps due to export restrictions (see International Traffic in Arms Regulations (ITAR)). The M829A3 uses a more efficient propellant, RPD-380, boosting its muzzle velocity. From patents submitted by Orbital ATK, the penetrator is composed of two sections, an approximately  steel tip and the rest composed of depleted uranium. This suggests the steel tip is used to defeat the ERA, with the depleted uranium used to complete the penetration through the vehicle's passive armor. The sabot is of composite material. This variant is unofficially referred to by Abrams tank crews as the "super sabot". Although the M829A3 fired from the 44-caliber M256 gun has a lower muzzle velocity than 120 mm shells fired from the Rheinmetall 55-caliber gun barrel or Russian 2A46 125 mm gun ammunition, it uses a larger penetrator with increased mass to increase imparted kinetic energy.

M829A4 
The A4 (formerly E4) variant was under development by General Dynamics Ordnance & Tactical Systems and Alliant Techsystems (ATK) until ATK received a $77 million, three-year contract on 11 July 2011 to develop and qualify the M829A4 Advanced Kinetic Energy (AKE) round for the U.S. Army's M1A2 SEP (System Enhancement Package) Abrams MBT.

The M829A4 is a fifth-generation APFSDS-T cartridge using a depleted-uranium penetrator with a three-petal composite sabot; the penetrator includes a low-drag fin with a tracer and a windshield and tip assembly. The new Advanced Combustible Cartridge Case is similar to previous models but has a relocated skive joint placement for better crew-member safety during handling. The initial order for 2,501 M829A4 rounds in 2014 had a unit cost of $10,100 each. On 20 July 2015, Orbital ATK announced that the M829E4 had passed First Article Acceptance Testing and was entering production. On 12 October 2015, Orbital ATK announced the round had recently received type classification as the M829A4 and was awarded a full-rate production contract to begin in early 2016.

References

External links
 M829A1 Technical details and images, from Global Security
 M829 120mm, APFSDS-T, from FAS.org
 PEO Ammunition Systems 
 M829A4 (formerly M829E4) Armor Piercing, Fin Stabilized, Discarding Sabot – Tracer (APFSDS-T)

Anti-tank rounds
Military equipment introduced in the 1990s